Arsonists Get All the Girls was an American metal band from Santa Cruz, California. Founded in 2005, the band was known for taking influence from varying genres, particularly in their early years for fusing extreme metal with various electronic music styles. They were previously signed to Century Media Records and have released five full-length studio albums: Hits from the Bow, The Game of Life, Portals, Motherland, and Listen to the Color.

Arsonists Get All the Girls was founded in Santa Cruz, California, in 2005. The band first wanted to develop a sound similar to Horse the Band. 

In November 2007, bassist Patrick Mason died of alcohol poisoning.

Arsonists Get All the Girls toured with Darkest Hour, Carnifex, and Bleeding Through, among others, in the Thrash and Burn European Tour 2009 in April and May 2009. The band was also scheduled to support It Dies Today on a North American tour in October 2009 but It Dies Today were denied access into Canada.

Their vocalist Cameron Reed left and was replaced by Jared Monnette. Reed returned as a guest vocalist on their fifth studio album, Listen To The Color which was released on August 1, 2013.

Band members

Final line-up
Cameron Reed – lead vocals, keyboards (2005–2009, 2019)
Sean Richmond – keyboards (2008–2015, 2016–2019), co-lead vocals (2008–2009, 2013–2015, 2019), lead vocals (2016–2019)
Sam Hafer - guitar (2017–2019) 
King Zabb - bass (2017–2019)
David Cubine – drums (2017–2019)

Previous members
James Lucas – guitar (2005–2006)
Adam Trowbridge – guitar (2005–2006)
Drek Yarra – guitar (2008–2009)
Garin Rosen - drums (2005-2015, 2016–2017)
Jaeson Bardoni - guitar  (2008-2009, 2009–2014), bass (2008, 2009)
Adam Swan – bass (2007)
Steve Dean – bass (2008)
Kyle Stacher – bass (2014–2015)
Ronnie Smith – guitar (2014–2015)
Francesco Presotto – guitar (2016–2017)
Brett Roos – guitar (2017)
Joey Souza – bass (2017)
Jared Monette – lead vocals (2009–2013)
Patrick Mason – bass (2005–2007, died 2007)
Nick Cardinelli – guitar (2005–2008)
Arthur Alvarez – guitar (2005–2013)
Greg Howell - bass (2009-2014, 2016-2017)
Remi Rødberg - keyboards (2005-2008,2013-2015), co-lead vocals (2005–2008), lead vocals (2013–2015)

 Timeline

Timeline

Discography

Music videos

References

External links

Arsonists Get All the Girls at Century Media

Heavy metal musical groups from California
American deathcore musical groups
Century Media Records artists
Musical groups established in 2005
Musical groups disestablished in 2015
Musical groups reestablished in 2016
Musical groups disestablished in 2019
Nintendocore musical groups
Electronicore musical groups
Metalcore musical groups from California